The Theological Building at A.M.E. Zion Theological Institute was a historic African Methodist Episcopal Zion Church school building on East Conecuh Street in Greenville, Alabama. This later became part of Lomax-Hannon Junior College. The building was built in 1911 and added to the National Register of Historic Places in 1986. The Theological Building was demolished in 2014.

History 
Bishop John Wesley Alstork had been an active member of the local African Methodist Episcopal Zion Church (A.M.E. Zion Church), and he founded the A.M.E. Zion Theological Institute in 1898, which contained the Theological Building that was built in 1911. The former A.M.E. Zion Theological Institute campus is now the campus of Lomax-Hannon Junior College.

References

Methodist churches in Alabama
Churches on the National Register of Historic Places in Alabama
Religious buildings and structures completed in 1911
Churches in Butler County, Alabama
Greenville, Alabama
National Register of Historic Places in Butler County, Alabama
1911 establishments in Alabama
African Methodist Episcopal Zion Church
Demolished buildings and structures in Alabama